Enger is a surname. Notable people with the surname include:

Anne Enger (born 1949), Norwegian politician
Asle Enger (1906–2000), Norwegian priest
Einar Enger (born 1950), Norwegian businessman
Elisabeth Enger (born 1958), Norwegian civil servant
Erling Enger (1899–1990), Norwegian painter
Gyda Enger (born 1993), Norwegian ski jumper
Inger S. Enger (born 1948), Norwegian politician
Ivar Enger, Norwegian heavy metal guitarist
Leif Enger (born 1961), American writer
Mark Enger (1963 -2011), Norwegian American artist
Ole Enger (chief executive), Norwegian president and CEO of Renewable Energy Corporation
Ole Enger (actor) (1948–2014), Norwegian actor and businessman
Per S. Enger (born 1929), Norwegian zoologist
Thorleif Enger (born 1943), Norwegian businessman

Norwegian-language surnames